Okuhle Cele (born 9 July 1997) is a South African cricketer. He currently plays for Northerns. 

Cele made his Twenty20 debut for KwaZulu-Natal against Boland in the 2016 Africa T20 Cup on 23 September 2016. He made his first-class debut for KwaZulu-Natal in the 2016–17 Sunfoil 3-Day Cup on 6 October 2016. He made his List A debut for KwaZulu-Natal in the 2016–17 CSA Provincial One-Day Challenge on 9 October 2016. In October 2018, he was named in Durban Heat's squad for the first edition of the Mzansi Super League T20 tournament.

In January 2021, Cele was named in South Africa's Twenty20 International (T20I) squad for their series against Pakistan. In April 2021, he was named in Northerns' squad, ahead of the 2021–22 cricket season in South Africa.

References

External links
 

1997 births
Living people
Cricketers from Durban
South African cricketers
KwaZulu-Natal cricketers
Dolphins cricketers
Durban Heat cricketers
Titans cricketers
Northerns cricketers